Jy or JY may refer to:

People
 Jimmy Young (broadcaster) (1921–2016), BBC radio broadcaster
 James Young (American musician) (born 1949), guitarist for Styx
 Joey Yung (born 1980), Hong Kong cantopop singer
 Kang Ji-young (born 1994), South Korean actress and singer

Other uses
 Air Turks and Caicos, IATA airline designator JY
 Jansky (symbol Jy), a non-SI unit of spectral flux density
 Japanese yen, a currency unit
 Jia Yu Channel, a 24-hour Mandarin subscription channel founded in Malaysia
 Jesus Youth (symbol Jy), an international missionary movement at the service of the Catholic Church